The Bałtyk–Karkonosze Tour is a cycling race in West Poland that runs between the Baltic Sea and the Karkonosze. The first edition was held in 1993 as an amateur race as the Karkonosze Tour with stages in the Wałbrzych Voivodeship and Jelenia Góra Voivodeship. In 1996, the race became professional. In 1997, it adopted the current North–South route. The race was part of the UCI Europe Tour from 2005 to 2009, went down to National Event status from 2010 to 2014, before returning to the UCI Europe Tour in 2015.

Past winners

References

External links

Recurring sporting events established in 1993
Cycle races in Poland
UCI Europe Tour races
1993 establishments in Poland
Spring (season) events in Poland